Fargesia nitida, commonly named blue fountain bamboo, is a clumping bamboo native to Szechwan, China. Medium to small and very cold hardy, but not tolerant of very high summer temperatures. This species bloomed in the years 2002–2005, so is not expected to bloom again for another 120 years.

This bloom is causing problems for the endangered Giant Panda, which consumes bamboo exclusively.

References

nitida